Lake Eleanor is a reservoir located in the northwestern backcountry of Yosemite National Park at an altitude of .

Geography
The lake was fed by three streams, Kibbie Creek, Eleanor Creek, and Frog Creek. Before being clearcut, the valley floor was moderately to densely forested with a yellow pine forest consisting primarily of Jeffrey and ponderosa pines, with scatterings of incense cedar, white fir, and black oak. Manzanita and other shrub species made up the understory, and willow and other wetland species existed in the marshy areas around the lake and streams.

History
An archeological survey done of the valley in 1985 while the reservoir was drained for maintenance provided evidence of prehistoric occupation of the valley.  Due to the limited time of the study and the nature of working in the sediment of a reservoir, the extent of occupation was unable to be assessed.

Settlement of Lake Eleanor valley by Europeans began in the mid 1800s.  In the late 1800s, two homestead patents were taken out in the valley, one by Hermann Wolfe on the south shore and another by Horace J. Kibbe on the north shore, which he occupied until 1913.

Dam construction
The current lake was formed in 1918 by damming Eleanor Creek as part of the Hetch Hetchy Reservoir system, constructed to supply water and power to the city of San Francisco.  The original smaller, natural lake was also named "Eleanor" after the daughter of Josiah Whitney, leader of the California Geological Survey in the 1860s.

This first stage of the Hetch Hetchy project was built for year-round hydroelectric power generation, which was then sold to help finance construction of the larger O'Shaughnessy Dam, completed in 1923.

That dams were planned for a valley in Yosemite National Park caused significant opposition. One of the most potent opponents was the Sierra Club and its founding President, John Muir. After two vetoes by Teddy Roosevelt, on December 19, 1913, Woodrow Wilson signed the Raker Act permitting construction. It began in 1914.

The remote location dictated the use of an unusual multiple-arch structure here. It dramatically minimized the amount of concrete used in comparison with a gravity dam.  Even more unusual, the concrete arches were elliptical rather than circular, the only multiple-arch dam ever built this way. Chief designer for the San Francisco Board of Public Works Michael O'Shaughnessy, along with hydraulic structural engineer R.P. McIntosh, were primarily responsible for the design.

Still owned and operated by the city of San Francisco, the lake now provides opportunities for angling, hiking, and camping.

Climate

See also
List of lakes in California

References

California Place Names, Erwin Gudde (University of California Press, 2004)

External links
 California Department of Water Resources: Lake Eleanor

Reservoirs in Tuolumne County, California
Lakes of Yosemite National Park
Hetch Hetchy Project
Tuolumne River
Eleanor